Jimmy Lwanga is a Ugandan politician and member of parliament. He was elected in office as a member of the parliament for Njeru Municipality in Buikwe District during the 2021 Uganda general elections.

He is a member of the National Unity Platform political party.

In the eleventh parliament, Lwanga serves on the Committee on Public Service and Local Government.

See also 
 List of members of the eleventh Parliament of Uganda
National Unity Platform
Wakiso District
Member of Parliament
Parliament of Uganda.

References

External links 

 Website of the Parliament of Uganda

Members of the Parliament of Uganda
Living people
Year of birth missing (living people)
21st-century Ugandan politicians
National Unity Platform politicians